Cylindera bonina is a species of ground beetle of the subfamily Cicindelinae that is endemic to Micronesia.

References

bonina
Beetles described in 1959
Fauna of Micronesia